Styx (Greek: Στύξ) is a weekly newspaper that features local and general information. It is based in Akrata in the eastern part of Achaea, Greece. It was first published in 2004. It is the Independent Cultural and Political Newspaper of the Northern Peloponnese. Its editor-in-chief is Vasileios Antoniou.

See also
List of newspapers in Greece

External links
Official Site 

Greek-language newspapers
Mass media in Western Greece
Publications established in 2004
Weekly newspapers published in Greece
2004 establishments in Greece

el:Στύξ (εφημερίδα)